James Murray, also known as Jim Murray is an English actor. He is best known for his television roles, including Stephen Hart in Primeval, Prince Andrew in The Crown, Niles Pottinger in Defiance, Daniel Coltrane in Cucumber, and Chief Superintendent John Houseman in McDonald & Dodds.

Early life 
Murray was born on 22 January 1975 in Manchester. He was awarded a classics scholarship by Malvern College, and has a degree in film. His great-grandfather, Richard Hollins Murray, invented the reflecting lens in 1927.

Career
Murray found fame in Primeval (ITV 2008) as expert tracker Stephen Hart, and in Cucumber (Channel 4 2015) as conflicted character Daniel Coltrane. 
Earlier on in his career he starred in a series of both film and television pieces, including the comedy series Roger-Roger (1999), legal drama series North Square (2000), mini series Other People's Children (2000) and Sons & Lovers (2003), a Granada production of The Sittaford Mystery (2006) as Charles Burnaby, a film of the Thomas Hardy story Under the Greenwood Tree (2005) as Dick Dewy, plus earlier films Nailing Vienna (2002) as Peter, All the King's Men (1999) as Pvt Will Needham, and Phoenix Blue (2001) as Rick. He also found more permanent roles in Channel 4's 20 Things to Do Before You're 30 (2003) playing Glen and BBC One's season four of Cutting It (2005) as Liam Carney.

Murray starred in the ITV science fiction series Primeval as Stephen Hart, Nick Cutter's lab technician, in both series one (2007) and series two (2008).

Murray had the leading role of the father, Frank Davis, in It's Alive (2008) a remake of the '70s horror classic by Larry Cohen.

He had a role in Kröd Mändoon and the Flaming Sword of Fire, a comic fantasy series for Comedy Central and BBC Two, which began airing in April 2009. His character is Ralph Longshaft.

In the US James was a lead in the CBS spy caper series CHAOS from 2010 to 2011. His character was called Billy Collins.

He was cast as Mayor Niles Pottinger, in the second series of Defiance, which first aired on 19 June 2014. Murray appeared in one episode (ep.3 Dead Air) of the third series which aired 27 June 2015.

He took over from Fay Ripley as lead DCI in the completely improvised show Suspects as DCI Daniel Drummond, which aired 3 to 31 August 2016 (all six episodes).

He starred as the father, Edward, in the three part ITV supernatural series HIM.

In 2016 Murray played The Doge of Venice in season 1 of Netflix's Medici, before playing the lead role of Wesley opposite Polly Walker in BBC1's Age Before Beauty.

In 2017 James directed his old friend veteran actor Robert Hardy CBE in his last role alongside Nina Sosanya in his short film in Familia.

He appeared as Caleb in the Ryan Reynolds film 6 Underground released in December 2019. He was Chief Superintendent John Houseman in the ITV series McDonald & Dodds.

In 2021 James was cast as Colonel Chic Harding in Apple TV's WW2 epic bomber drama Masters of the Air. The series is directed by Cary Joji Fukunaga and exec produced by Steven Spielberg and Tom Hanks.

Murray directed & co-presented ITV's Robson and Jim’s Icelandic flyfishing adventure (July 2021), a passion project about the therapeutic values of fly fishing set in the bountiful rivers in Iceland.

In August 2021 it was announced that Murray will be playing the role of Prince Andrew in the final two seasons of Netflix The Crown.

Personal life
Murray married his Cutting It co-star Sarah Parish in Hampshire on 15 December 2007, following a two-year romance. On 18 January 2008, it was announced that Parish was pregnant with their first child. Their daughter, Ella-Jayne, was born 5 weeks premature in May 2008 and died in January 2009 aged 8 months due to a congenital heart defect.

Their daughter Nell was born 21 November 2009.

In honour of Ella-Jayne, Parish and Murray began raising funds for the Paediatric Intensive Care Unit at Southampton General Hospital, where she was cared for. Their efforts led to them creating the Murray Parish Trust in 2014, to enhance overall paediatric emergency care serving Southern England. To date the trust has raised over £5 million including a new, state of the art children's Emergency and trauma department.

Filmography

References

External links
 https://www.instagram.com/thejimmurray/?hl=en

 The Murray Parish Trust

1975 births
Living people
Male actors from Manchester
English male television actors
English male film actors